The 1997 Paris–Tours was the 91st edition of the Paris–Tours cycle race and was held on 5 October 1997. The race started in Paris and finished in Tours. The race was won by Andrei Tchmil of the Lotto team: the average speed of 47.17 km/h earned Tchmil the Ruban Jaune.

General classification

References

1997 in French sport
1997
Paris-Tours
1997 in road cycling
October 1997 sports events in Europe